A list of films produced by the Israeli film industry in 1965.

1965 releases

See also
1965 in Israel

References

External links
 Israeli films of 1965 at the Internet Movie Database

Israeli
Film
1965